Santiago Mederos is the name of:

Santiago Villalba Mederos (born 1991), American former fugitive
Santiago Mederos (baseball) (1944–1979), Cuban baseball player
Santiago Mederos (footballer) (born 1998), Uruguayan footballer